The 1985 World Rowing Championships refer to the World Rowing Championships held from 26 August to 1 September 1985 at Hazewinkel in Belgium.

Medal summary

Medalists at the 1985 World Rowing Championships were:

Men's events

Women's events

Medal table

References

Rowing competitions in Belgium
World Rowing Championships
World Rowing Championships
Rowing
Rowing
Rowing
Rowing